Mount Kembar (means: Twin Mountain) is a Pleistocene volcano, located in the northern Sumatra island, Indonesia. It contains a fumarole field, named Gayolesten. The volcanic complex is located in the junction of two geological fault systems and it is a shield volcano.

See also 

 List of volcanoes in Indonesia

References 
 

Volcanoes of Sumatra
Polygenetic shield volcanoes
Kembar
Pleistocene shield volcanoes